Jeanne Mance (November 12, 1606 – June 18, 1673) was a French nurse and settler of New France. She arrived in New France two years after the Ursuline nuns came to Quebec. Among the founders of Montreal in 1642, she established its first hospital, the Hôtel-Dieu de Montréal, in 1645. She returned twice to France to seek financial support for the hospital. After providing most of the care directly for years, in 1657 she recruited three sisters of the Religieuses hospitalières de Saint-Joseph, and continued to direct operations of the hospital. During her era, she was also known as Jehanne Mance contemporarily by the French, and as Joan Mance by the English contemporarily.

Origins
Jeanne Mance was born (as Jehanne Mance) into a bourgeois family in Langres, in Haute-Marne, France. She was the daughter of Catherine Émonnot and Charles Mance, a prosecutor for the king in Langres, an important diocese in the northern Burgundy. After her mother died, Jeanne cared for eleven brothers and sisters. She went on to care for victims of the Thirty Years War and the plague.

Vocation
At age 34, while on a pilgrimage to Troyes in Champagne, Mance discovered her missionary calling. She decided to go to New France in North America, then in the first stages of colonization by the French. She was supported by Anne of Austria, the wife of King Louis XIII, and by the Jesuits. She was not interested in marriage in Nouvelle-France.

Mance was a member of the Société Notre-Dame de Montréal; its goal was to convert the natives and found a hospital in Montreal similar to the one in Quebec.

Founding of Montreal and Hôtel-Dieu Hospital

Charles Lallemant recruited Jeanne Mance for the Société Notre-Dame de Montréal. Mance embarked from La Rochelle on May 9, 1641, on a crossing of the Atlantic that took three months. After wintering in Quebec, she and Paul Chomedey de Maisonneuve arrived at the Island of Montreal in the spring of 1642. They founded the new city on May 17, 1642, on land granted by the Governor. That same year Mance began operating a hospital in her home.

Three years later (1645), with a donation of 6000 francs by Angélique Bullion, she opened a hospital on Rue Saint-Paul. She directed its operations for 17 years. A new stone structure was built in 1688, and others have been built since then.

Later years
In 1650, Mance visited France, returning with 22,000 French livres from Duchesse d’Aiguillon to fund the hospital (which later, was increased to 40,500 livres). On her return to Montreal, she found that the attacks of the Iroquois threatened the colony and loaned the hospital money to M. de Maisonneuve, who returned to France to organize a force of one hundred men for the colony's defense.

Mance made a second trip to France in 1657 to seek financial assistance for the hospital. At the same time, she secured three Hospital Sisters of the Religious Hospitallers of St. Joseph from the convent of La Fleche in Anjou: Judith Moreau de Bresoles, Catherine Mace, and Marie Maillet. They had a difficult passage on the return, made worse by an outbreak of the plague on board, but all four women survived. While Mgr. de Laval tried to retain the sisters at Quebec for that hospital, they eventually reached Montreal in October 1659.

With the help of the new sisters, Mance was able to ensure the continued operations of the hospital. For the rest of her years, she lived more quietly.

She died in 1673 after a long illness and was buried in the church of the Hôtel-Dieu Hospital. While the church and her house were demolished in 1696 for redevelopment, her work was carried on by the Religious Hospitallers of St. Joseph. The three nuns whom she had recruited in 1659 served as hospital administrators. Two centuries later, in 1861, the hospital was moved to the foot of Mount Royal.

Legacy
A small statuette (2008) representing Jeanne Mance by André Gauthier was commissioned for the Canadian Nurses Association for a biannual award of nursing excellence.
Rue Jeanne-Mance, a north–south street in Montreal, is named after Mance.
Jeanne-Mance Park, situated on Park Avenue, opposite Mount Royal, and just south of Mount Royal Avenue, is named after Mance.
Jeanne-Mance, a district of Plateau Mont-Royal
Jeanne-Mance Building, situated on Eglantine Driveway, Tunneys Pasture, Ottawa, Ontario, Canada. A Federal Government of Canada Office Tower currently occupied by Health Canada.
Jeanne Mance Hall is a dormitory on the campus of University of Vermont. It is situated across the street from the student health center.
A statue (1968) was erected in the Square Olivier-Lahalle in her hometown of Langres by the Association Langres - Montréal.

Gallery

References

Further reading
 Joanna Emery, "Angel of the Colony," Beaver (Aug/Sep 2006) 86#4 pp 37–41. online
 Sister Elizabeth MacPherson. Jeanne Mance: The Woman, the Legend and the Glory (Bronson Agency, Toronto, 1985)

External links 
 
 Jeanne Mance(1606-1673): Nurse : First Lay Nurse in North America
 

1606 births
1673 deaths
People from Langres
Settlers of Canada
Colonists of Fort Ville-Marie
People of New France
Canadian nurses
Canadian women nurses
Société Notre-Dame de Montréal
Persons of National Historic Significance (Canada)
Canadian Servants of God
Venerated Catholics by Pope Francis